Ohio is the twenty-second-wealthiest state in the United States of America, with a per capita income of $21,003 (2000).

Ohio counties ranked by per capita income

Note: Data is from the 2010 United States Census Data and the 2006-2010 American Community Survey 5-Year Estimates.

See also
Economy of Ohio

References 

Ohio
Economy of Ohio
Income